The University of Sialkot or USKT is a private university located in Sialkot, Punjab, Pakistan. It was established in 2018 and has eight faculties.

History 
In 2013, University of Gujrat established a sub-campus in Sialkot under Public Private Partnership (PPP) mode. Later in 2018, the campus was upgraded to a full-fledged university under private sector. Chartered under the University of Sialkot Act (IX) of 2018, the university is providing higher learning in the areas of Computing & IT, Engineering & Architecture, Humanities & Social Sciences, Law, Management, Textile & Fashion Design, Sciences and Allied Health Sciences. With 08 Faculties, 30 Academic Departments, 94 Academic Programs, and around 10,000 Students.

Faculties and courses

Faculty of Allied Health Sciences 
 ADP Sports and Rehabilitation Sciences
 Doctor of Physiotherapy (5 Year)
 BS Dietitian and Nutrition
 BS Imaging Technology
 BS Medical Lab Technology

Faculty of Computing & Information Technology 
 ADP Computer Science
 ADP Information Technology Studies
 ADP Computer Programming
 ADP Software Development
 BS Computer Science
 BS Information Technology
 BS Software Engineering
 MS Computer Science
 Ph.D. Computer Science

Faculty of Engineering & Architecture 
ADP Electrical Engineering Technology
ADP Mechanical Engineering Technology
ADP Structural Engineering Technology
BSc Civil Engineering Technology
BSc Electrical Engineering Technology
BSc Mechanical Engineering Technology
MS Electrical Engineering

Faculty of Humanities & Social Science 
 ADP Media and Communication Studies
 ADP English
 BS English
 BS Clinical Psychology
 BS Media and Communication
 BS International Relations
 BS Urdu
 MS English
 MS Islamic Studies
 MS Education
 MS Urdu
 MS International Relations

Faculty of Law 
 Paralegal
 LL.B. [to be offered in Fall Semester]

Faculty of Management & Administrative Sciences 
 ADP Business Studies
 ADP Account, Finance & E-Commerce
 BBA
 BS Accounting and Finance
 BS Aviation Management
 MS Business Administration
 MBA
 Executive MBA

Faculty of Sciences 
 BS Biochemistry
 BS Biotechnology
 BS Chemistry
 BS Mathematics
 BS Physics
 BS Zoology
 MS Mathematic
 MS Physics
 MS Chemistry
 MS Zoology
 MS Biological Sciences

Faculty of Textile & Fashion Designing 
 ADP Fashion Design
 BS Program | 4 Year
 BS Fashion Design

Center for Extended Learning 
The Center for Extended Learning, University of Sialkot (USKT) has been established as a platform for Business Executives, Managers, Professionals, and Students to enhance their skills, refresh their knowledge and cover academic deficiencies.

International affliation
Çankaya University
Jiangsu University
Istanbul Gelisim University
Uşak University

See also
 University of Gujrat

References

2013 establishments in Pakistan
Educational institutions established in 2013
Private universities and colleges in Punjab, Pakistan
Universities and colleges in Sialkot